JCB Triumph Hurdle Trial may refer to:

Prestbury Juvenile Novices' Hurdle, a horse race held at Cheltenham Racecourse each November
Finesse Juvenile Novices' Hurdle, a horse race held at Cheltenham Racecourse each January